Anne Hepburn (20 August 1925 – 29 July 2016) was a Church of Scotland missionary and a teacher, feminist and social justice advocate and wife and mother. She served as National President of the Church of Scotland's Women's Guild in the early 1980s, where she led the debate on the issue of the "Motherhood of God".

Early life and education 
Anne Burton was born in Dailly, South Ayrshire on 20 August 1925. Her mother died when she was a child of eighteen months, and she grew up with her blacksmith father, who was also a church elder. She went onto study at Glasgow University, before training as a teacher at Jordanhill. When she graduated, she taught at a small village school in the village of Barr for three years before applying to the Women's Foreign Mission Committee of the Church of Scotland. She was accepted for training at St Colm's College, a Church of Scotland college.

Mission work 
In 1950 Anne Burton was sent to Malawi, then called Nyasaland, as headmistress of a mission primary school for girls. She met her future husband, fellow missionary James Lamb (Hamish) Hepburn, first at a Church of Scotland weekend in Galashiels and later on the voyage to Malawi and in August 1954 they married. Their three children Catherine, Margaret and Kenneth were born in Malawi. The political struggles that began in 1959 against the planned Central African Federation resulted in independence for Nyasaland, but an uncertain climate for those who opposed the new regime. In 1964, when on furlough in Scotland, the Hepburns were advised not to return to Malawi.

Life in the Church 
Anne Hepburn settled in Kirkcudbright, Dumfries & Galloway, where her husband Hamish became minister. Anne was active in the Women's Guild, serving as National Vice-president from 1972 to 1975, and she was ordained as an elder of the Church of Scotland in 1974. In 1981, Hepburn became National President of the Women's Guild.

Motherhood of God controversy 
In her opening remarks to the 1982 April annual meeting of the Women's Guild, Anne Hepburn decided to use a prayer written by the Rev. Brian Wren which addressed "God our Mother" (the original typewritten script is now preserved in the New College Library Archives). The prayer caused audible upset, and many letters of complaint followed.

Nevertheless, this first step was followed by the creation of a study by the General Assembly of the Church of Scotland to study the theological implications of the Motherhood of God. But when this group reported back to the General Assembly, the topic was shelved. Nevertheless, the discussion continued around the world.

Works

References

20th-century Ministers of the Church of Scotland
1925 births
2016 deaths
Scottish Presbyterian missionaries
People from South Ayrshire
Presbyterian missionaries in Malawi
Nyasaland people
Female Christian missionaries
Elders of the Church of Scotland
21st-century Ministers of the Church of Scotland